Ratking (often stylized in all caps as RATKING) was an American hip hop group from New York City, which consisted of rappers Wiki and Hak, and producer Sporting Life. A leading force in the underground in the early 2010s, their music has been described as "stridently youthful", and the group themselves have stated they wished to reinvent rap music.

On June 22, 2016, Hak announced his departure, citing that the group "didn't see me for me", and self-released his debut solo album June. This led to the group's indefinite hiatus with Wiki and Sporting Life also venturing into further solo works. Around the same time, Wiki had already formed a supergroup with Lil Ugly Mane and Antwon, called Secret Circle, which he recorded with until an unexpected disband in 2018.

History

They released their debut EP Wiki93 in November 2012. It was based on 1993, an earlier mixtape  which he released in October 2011. 1993 was inspired by Suicide and Wu-Tang Clan. The group were signed by British label XL Recordings following 1993, and they re-released it as Wiki93 through their Hot Charity (HXC) imprint.

They released their debut album So It Goes in 2014. It was produced by Sporting Life and engineered by Young Guru. The album's title was inspired by Kurt Vonnegut's novel Slaughterhouse-Five. The album featured collaborations with King Krule, Salomon Faye, and Princess Nokia. They have performed with Skepta and toured with Death Grips, and Earl Sweatshirt, as well as Run the Jewels and Despot. In January 2015 the group announced that their next album 700 Fill would be released in January or February 2015. It was released for free via BitTorrent in March 2015.

Musical style
In addition to being inspired by rap and hip hop, the group has also cited punk rock and "many and diverse influences, from Animal Collective to Suicide" as influences on their alternative style. Wiki's solo EP 1993, later re-released as Wiki93, was inspired by Suicide and Wu-Tang Clan.

Discography

Studio albums

Extended plays

Mixtapes

Singles

As lead artist

Members
Wiki - vocals, rapping (2011−2016)
Hak - vocals, rapping, singing (2011−2016)
Sporting Life - production (2011−2016)

 Additional personnel
Racerra - production (2011−2012)
Ramon - production (2012−2014)

References

External links

2011 establishments in New York City
American hip hop groups
Hip hop groups from New York City
Musical groups established in 2011
XL Recordings artists